Jarrod Bowen (born 20 December 1996) is an English professional footballer who plays as a winger or forward for  club West Ham United and the England national team. He has previously played for Hereford United and Hull City.

Early life
Bowen was born in Leominster, Herefordshire. Growing up, his idol was David Beckham and he supported Manchester United.

Club career

Hereford United
After unsuccessful trials at Aston Villa and Cardiff City, Bowen started his career as a scholar at Hereford United. At the age of 17, Bowen was given his Hereford United first team debut by manager Peter Beadle after impressing for the youth team that season, playing in a 2–0 loss against Barnet on 22 March 2014. He scored his first career goal on 21 April 2014 in Hereford's 3–2 home victory over Alfreton Town.

Hull City

After Hereford were expelled from the Football Conference in June 2014, Bowen signed for Premier League club Hull City in July. After impressing during pre-season in 2016, he made his first-team debut for Hull on 23 August, playing the full 90 minutes in a 3–1 EFL Cup victory over Exeter City. On 7 November 2016, Bowen signed a new two-year contract with Hull.

Bowen scored his first goal for Hull on 5 August 2017, away to Aston Villa in a 1–1 draw. In September 2017, Bowen signed a new contract that tied him to the club until June 2020. He scored 15 goals in all competitions during the 2017–18 season, which saw him finish as Hull's top scorer. At the annual end of season awards ceremony on 8 May 2018, Bowen won both the Hull City Supporter's Player of the Year and Players' Player of the Year awards.

Bowen was nominated for the EFL Championship Player of the Month award for December 2018, subsequently winning the award in January 2019. In March 2019, he was selected as part of the 2018–19 Championship Team of the Season. He scored 22 goals in all competitions during the 2018–19 season, which saw him finish as Hull's top scorer again. At the annual end of season awards ceremony on 7 May 2019, Bowen won the Player of the Year, Players' Player of the Year and Hull City Supporter's Player of the Year awards. 

On 27 November 2019, Bowen scored his 50th goal for Hull as a part of a brace during a 4-0 home win over Preston North End. He would score his last goal for the Tigers in a 1-0 away win against Sheffield Wednesday on 1 January 2020.

West Ham United
On 31 January 2020, Bowen joined West Ham United on a permanent transfer, with the Premier League club paying an initial £18 million for the forward, with up to £7 million in potential add-ons. On 29 February 2020, in his first start for West Ham, Bowen scored his first goal for the club, in a 3–1 win against Southampton.

On 27 September 2020, Bowen scored his first goals of the 2020–21 Premier League season, scoring twice in a 4–0 win against Wolverhampton Wanderers; West Ham's first league win of the season. On 4 October 2020, a week later, Bowen added to his tally for the season, scoring the third goal in a 3–0 away win against Leicester City. During the second half of the season, Bowen scored three goals in three consecutive games, in a 3–3 draw against Arsenal and 3–2 wins over Wolves and Leicester, taking his tally up to eight goals for the season.

Bowen scored his first goal in European football during the 2021–22 Europa League in a 3–0 win over Genk on 21 October 2021. On 8 May 2022, Bowen recorded two assists against Norwich City, becoming the first West Ham player to record ten goals and ten assists in a single season since Paolo di Canio in the 1999–2000 season. A day later, Bowen was named as West Ham's players' player of the season. Bowen finished the 2021–22 season as West Ham’s top scorer with 18 goals in all competitions, with 12 coming in the Premier League.

International career
Bowen received his first senior call-up for England on 24 May 2022 for the following month’s Nations League games against Hungary, Germany and Italy. On 4 June 2022, Bowen made his debut for England, playing the full 90 minutes in a 1–0 loss against Hungary, drawing praise from The Daily Telegraph for his performance.

Style of play 
Regarded as a quick, direct, mobile, energetic player with good technique and an eye for goal, Jarrod Bowen is predominantly known for his speed, movement, clinical finishing, agility and ball control, as well as his ability to use both his pace and flair on the ball in order to create scoring opportunities for himself or his teammates. A versatile forward, he primarily plays as a winger on the right flank, a position which allows him to cut into the centre onto his stronger left foot, and either shoot on goal or play quick exchanges with other players and make runs in behind the defence towards goal. He can also play in the centre as main striker, behind the main striker as either an attacking midfielder or second striker.

Personal life
Bowen's father, Sam, was a former semi-professional footballer. Whilst at Merthyr Tydfil, for whom he scored five goals on his debut for in August 1996, Sam won a trial with West Ham under the management of Harry Redknapp, before the move fell through due to Merthyr's financial demands for Sam's services. Sam also scored hat-tricks on his debuts for Forest Green Rovers and Worcester City, leading to the South Wales Argus labelling him a "debut king" upon his transfer to Newport County in January 2004.

In October 2021, Bowen was reported to be in a relationship with reality television personality Dani Dyer. On 20 January 2023, the couple announced they were expecting twins.

Career statistics

Club

International

Honours
Individual
Hull City Supporters' Player of the Year: 2017–18
Hull City Players' Player of the Year: 2017–18
EFL Championship Player of the Month: December 2018, November 2019
EFL Team of the Season: 2018–19
West Ham United Players' Player of the Year: 2021–22

References

External links

 Jarrod Bowen at West Ham United F.C. (archive)
 Jarrod Bowen at Hull City A.F.C. (archived)
 
 
 
 

1996 births
Living people
People from Leominster
Footballers from Herefordshire
English footballers
Association football midfielders
Association football wingers
Association football forwards
Association football utility players
Hereford United F.C. players
Hull City A.F.C. players
West Ham United F.C. players
National League (English football) players
Premier League players
English Football League players
England international footballers